Jason Bowen may refer to:
Jason Bowen (ice hockey) (born 1973), retired Canadian ice hockey player
Jason Bowen (footballer) (born 1972), Welsh former footballer